Micromonospora noduli is a bacterium from the genus Micromonospora which has been isolated from the nodules from the plant Pisum sativum in Cañizal, Spain.

References

 

Micromonosporaceae
Bacteria described in 2016